Beijing Normal University (BNU), colloquially known as Beishida, is a public research university located in Beijing, China, with a strong emphasis on humanities and sciences. It is one of the oldest and most prestigious universities in China as part of Class A Double First Class University in the Double First Class University Plan and was designated by the Chinese Ministry of Education as a member of Project 985 and Project 211.

"Normal school" refers to an institution that trained schoolteachers in the early 20th century. The title is preserved in the names of Chinese institutions after they developed into comprehensive universities. It also reflects BNU's heritage as a Faculty of Education member of the Imperial University of Peking which was established as China's first modern university.

BNU ranked first among universities that originated as “normal schools”. The Faculty of Education is considered the best in China according to several widely cited international rankings, including the QS Rankings, the Academic Ranking of World Universities, and the U.S. News Rankings, and the URAP ranking. BNU is ranked 36th among the Global Top 100 Innovative Universities according to the World's Universities with Real Impacts (WURI) Ranking 2021.

History 
The university grew out of the Faculty of Education at the Imperial University of Peking by the emperor after the Hundred Days' Reform in 1898. In 1908 the Faculty of Education was named the "Imperial Capital School of Supreme Teacher Training" and separated from the Imperial University of Peking which subsequently became Peking University.

In 1912, after the Republic of China was established, the Imperial Capital School of Supreme Teacher Training was renamed Peking Normal College. The college established its first graduate programs in 1920 and began accepting female students in 1921. In 1923 it was renamed Peking Normal University and became the first normal university in modern Chinese history. The Peking Women's College of Education merged into Peking Normal University in 1931.

When the Communist Party established the People's Republic of China in 1949 the capital of Peking was renamed, via pinyin, as Beijing and the university was consequently renamed Beijing Normal University. During a national initiative of university rearrangement in 1952 Fu Jen Catholic University merged with Beijing Normal University. In 1954 BNU moved from its Hepingmen campus to the newly established campus at Beitaipingzhuang. In 1959, BNU was designated by the Ministry of Education as one of 20 national key universities of China.

Historically, students at Beijing Normal University have played major roles in patriotic, democratic and other social movements, including the May Fourth Movement in 1919, and other significant cultural and sociopolitical events. The New York Times described it as "one of the most progressive institutions" in China. During the Cultural Revolution Beijing Normal University students made up the majority of Red Guards, a Maoist movement that killed thousands of people and attempted to destroy what they saw as "outdated" and "backwards" artifacts and cultural institutions.

Present 

Beijing Normal University was selected to be a Project 211 institution in 1996. In 2002, BNU signed an agreement with the Ministry of Education and Beijing municipal government to become the 10th university participating in Project 985, through which it receives special support from the Chinese government aimed at elevating its reputation to the level of a "world-class" university.

During its centennial celebration in 2002 an asteroid discovered in 1996 was named after the university as 8050 Beishida.

After a special visit by Premier Wen Jiabao to the university on May 4, 2006, the Chinese government implemented a tuition-waiver policy for teacher training programs in six normal universities that are supervised by the Ministry of Education, including Beijing Normal University.

The university has a strong emphasis on increasing educational equity. Its 2009 demographic data shows that 40% of its enrolled students were from western China, one third were from rural areas and a quarter were from low-income families. Ethnic minorities comprised more than 10% of students.

Academics 
As of the year 2020, the university has 74 undergraduate degree programs, 185 master programs and 142 doctoral programs. Sixteen of them are honored as "national key disciplines", including 5 general disciplines and 11 specialized disciplines, which are recognized among the top ranked programs in China:

Beijing Normal University possesses 74 research laboratories, including 4 National Key Labs, 7 Key Labs of the Ministry of Education and 5 Key Labs of the Beijing Municipality. Key research centers and facilities include 7 key research facilities in humanities and social sciences of the Ministry of Education, 2 research centers of Engineering and Technology of the Beijing Municipality, 3 research centers jointly established with the Beijing Municipality, and more than 40 other research centers. Additionally, the university has an institute dedicated to Proteomics, the only one established in a university by the Ministry of Education. The university has also established a Science Park comprising 6 hectares.

Beijing Normal University's annual research budget in the sciences exceeds RMB 100 million. In 2010, 150 projects were funded by the National Natural Science Foundation, with a record high amount of RMB 62 million (compared with 44.7 million in 2009 and 37 million in 2007).

Funding for research in the humanities and social sciences has increased rapidly in the last five years to RMB 150 million, the third largest budget nationally. Since 2002, the annual increase in budget has been over RMB 30 million, equating to RMB 40,000 per capita. This increase in funding reflects BNU's institutional commitment to basic theory and research in the humanities and social sciences.

International Collaboration 
Beijing Normal University is part of a university consortium, including the University for Continuing Education Krems, Eötvös Loránd University, Hochschule Osnabrück University of Applied Sciences, Thapar Institute of Engineering and Technology and the University of Tampere, which offers an Erasmus+ joint master's degree and a Master in Research and Innovation in Higher Education.

Beijing Normal University was among the first Chinese institutions to accept international students. It is particularly popular for its Mandarin Chinese study programs. Among its most prestigious programs is Princeton in Beijing, a collaboration with Princeton University in the United States.

The university collaborates with the Singapore University of Social Sciences (SUSS) on SUSS's Master of Arts in Chinese Language and Literature.

Beijing Normal University is the seat of the BRICS Universities League Secretariat with BNU as a leading university in terms of BRICS higher education and academic cooperation.

Rankings and reputation 
BNU ranked No.1 in China among universities that originated as “normal schools”.  The Faculty of Education is considered the best in China according to several widely cited international rankings, including the QS World University Rankings, the Academic Ranking of World Universities, the U.S. News & World Report Best Global Universities Ranking, and the University Ranking by Academic Performance. 

In 2022, BNU was ranked 19th globally by the Times Higher Education Rankings by Subjects, and 28th by the QS World University Rankings by Subjects, for "Education and Training", which are historical strengths for the Faculty of Education that originated as a "normal university".

BNU is ranked 36th among the Global Top 100 Innovative Universities according to the World's Universities with Real Impacts (WURI) Ranking 2021.

According to the 2021 QS World University Rankings, BNU was ranked among the top 170 in "Arts and Humanities", "Social Sciences & Management" and "Natural Science" related subjects.

Beijing Normal University consistently features in the top 300th global universities as ranked by the Academic Ranking of World Universities, the QS World University Rankings, the Times Higher Education World University Rankings and the U.S. News & World Report. Beijing Normal graduates are highly desired in China and worldwide; in 2017, its graduate employability rankings placed in the global top #200+ universities with high-achieving graduates. Internationally, Beijing Normal University was regarded as one of the most reputable Chinese universities by the Times Higher Education World Reputation Rankings where, it has ranked #126 globally. 
 QS World University Ranking : 262nd, 12th in China
 Academic Ranking of World Universities : 201-300th, 7th-12th in China
 Times Higher Education World University Rankings : 251-300th, 11th in China

Schools and Departments 

Faculty of Education
School of Chinese Language and Literature
School of Law
School of Economy and Business Administration
School of Foreign Language and Culture
School of Life Science
School of Chemistry
School of Resources
School of Geography
Department of Astronomy
School of Mathematics
School of History
School of Philosophy
Department of Physics
School of Systems Science
School of Psychology
School of Social Development and Public Policy
School of Arts and Mass Media
School of Environment
School of Sociology
Beijing Normal University also has many other areas of study not mentioned above.

Campus

The main campus is in the Haidian District, with other Beijing campuses in the Changping District and Xicheng District as well as a campus in Zhuhai, Guangdong.

The original campus was near Hepingmen and Liulichang in the center of Beijing during the Republic of China period.  After Fu Jen University merged with BNU the Fu Jen campus in Shichahai became the Northern Campus of BNU.

Beijing Normal University's current campus was built in 1954. It is located in central northwest Beijing in Haidian district between the second and third ring roads. It is the closest of all Haidian universities to Tiananmen Square.

Its campus hosted the U.S. Olympic Team during the 2008 Beijing Olympics.

Notable alumni
Mo Yan, writer, 2012 Nobel Literature Prize laureate
Liu Xiaobo, writer and dissident, 2010 Nobel Peace Prize laureate
Su Tong, novelist
Cao Shui, poet, novelist and screenwriter
Xie Jun, chess grandmaster
Zhu Jin, astronomer
Lang Ping, gold medalist in 1984 Summer Olympics women's volleyball, and former head coach of the U.S. women's national volleyball team
Dao Youhe, well-known specialist in Chinese education
Chen Yibing, gymnast, 2008 Summer Olympics and 2012 Summer Olympics gold medalist
Xu Jialu, professor of Chinese, politician, and former vice chairman of the National People's Congress
Yuan Guiren, professor of philosophy, and the former Minister of Education of the People's Republic of China
Sun Siwei, well-known specialist in Chinese education
Yu Dan, professor well known for her popular and controversial lectures about the Analects broadcast on China Central Television
Ye Ding, psychologist
Weidong Li, professor of astronomy, the first Chinese astronomer to discover a supernovae since 1054 A.D.
Min Weifang, former CPC Secretary of Peking University, serving from 2002 to 2011. He is a graduate of the Education Department, subsequently earning his Ph.D. from Stanford University in the United States
Wang Dezhao or Ouang Te Tchao, prominent Chinese physicist, academician of the Chinese Academy of Sciences, student of French physicist Paul Langevin and founder of underwater acoustics in China, Officier of the French National Order of the Legion of Honour.
Wang Xiaodong, elected member of the United States National Academy of Sciences, former biochemist at the University of Texas Southwestern Medical Center, and currently Director and Investigator at the National Institute of Biological Sciences, Beijing (NIBS, Beijing)
Liang Jun, teacher and women's rights activist
Timothy Geithner, 75th United States Secretary of the Treasury. He attended as a language student studying Mandarin in 1982 as an undergraduate at Dartmouth College.
Kirsten Gillibrand, United States Senator from New York. She attended as an undergraduate in Dartmouth College's FSP program.

Affiliated high schools 

Experimental High School Attached to Beijing Normal University
The High School Affiliated to Beijing Normal University
The Second High School Attached to Beijing Normal University

See also 
List of universities in China

References

External links
BNU Official Site 
MDJS BBS @BNU (telnet, ssh)
BNU Student Forum 

 
Teachers colleges in China
Universities and colleges in Beijing
Universities and colleges in Haidian District
Universities and colleges in Guangdong
Project 211
Project 985
Plan 111
Educational institutions established in 1902
1902 establishments in China
Zhuhai
Vice-ministerial universities in China